Catapult is a sports performance analytics company, listed on the Australian Stock Exchange, that provides performance technology to 2970 teams, across 39 sports, in 137 countries. The company is headquartered in Melbourne, Australia.

History 
Catapult was founded by engineers Shaun Holthouse and Igor van de Griendt, and is today led by CEO Will Lopes. In 1999 the pair were working with the Cooperative Research Centres (CRC) during a project with the Australian Institute of Sport (AIS) seeking to replace laboratory-based performance testing with microtechnology, as athletes were not exerting themselves in lab conditions in the same way as they do in competition.
Catapult was launched as a business in 2006 and became a publicly listed company on the Australian Stock Exchange in 2014.

Products 
There are three physical products: Catapult Vector, the ClearSky T6 and Optimeye S5. Each of these pieces of hardware is worn by athletes to help track different elements of their performances. 

ClearSky is a local positioning system (LPS) Catapult developed in conjunction with the Commonwealth Scientific and Industrial Research Organisation (CSIRO) that delivers accurate positional and inertial data in varying environments.

Catapult also developed a pioneering goalkeeper monitor, the G5, which quantifies the direction and intensity of dives, jumps, accelerations/decelerations, changes of direction, repeat high intensity efforts, and time to recovery.

Through its acquisition of GPSports, XOS Digital, PlayerTek, SportsMedElite and Baseline Athlete Management Systems Catapult now offers video technology and GPS systems for semi-professional sports teams and amateur football players.

Clients 
Teams which have used Catapult include Brazil, Real Madrid, Chelsea, Saracens and the Australian Cricket Team.  Organisations, leagues and governing bodies include the England and Wales Cricket Board, NRL, La Liga, and the XFL.

References

Electronics companies established in 2006
Australian companies established in 2006
Manufacturing companies based in Melbourne
Sporting goods manufacturers of Australia
Wearable devices
Wearable computers